Philip Knopf (November 18, 1847 – August 14, 1920) was a U.S. Representative from Illinois.

Biography
Born near Long Grove, Illinois, Knopf attended public schools. During the Civil War, he enlisted in Company I, 147th Illinois Volunteer Infantry Regiment, and served until the regiment was mustered out in Savannah, Georgia.
He moved to Chicago in 1866 and attended Bryant & Stratton College for one year.
He engaged in the teaming business until 1884, when he was appointed chief deputy coroner and served eight years. He served as a member of the Illinois State senate from 1886 to 1894. He served as clerk of Cook County from 1894 to 1902. He served as a delegate to the Republican National Convention in 1896 and as a member of the State Republican central committee.

Knopf was elected as a Republican to the Fifty-eighth, Fifty-ninth, and Sixtieth Congresses (March 4, 1903 – March 3, 1909). He served as chairman of the Committee on Expenditures in the Department of the Treasury (Fifty-ninth and Sixtieth Congresses).

Knopf died in Chicago, Illinois on August 14, 1920. He was interred in Rosehill Cemetery.

References

External links
 

1847 births
1920 deaths
Burials at Rosehill Cemetery
Union Army soldiers
Republican Party members of the United States House of Representatives from Illinois
People from Long Grove, Illinois
Bryant and Stratton College alumni